Orest "Orie" J. Amodeo (March 9, 1921 – December 26, 1998) was an American musician who was a member of the Lawrence Welk orchestra from 1945 to 1970. His primary instruments were the flute, saxophone and clarinet.

Early life 
Amodeo was born in Mechanicville, New York, on March 9, 1921. A self-taught musician from a young age, he learned all the woodwind instruments and the violin. He attended Mechanicville High School and graduated in 1938. 

Prior to playing with the Lawrence Welk orchestra he was a member of the Amodeo City Band in Mechanicville, under his father. He also played for the band at his high school, and as part of a small band at Joyce's Log Cabin, a local tavern and music venue. He moved to Los Angeles with his family in 1951. Amodeo served in the United States Army.

Career 
Amodeo joined the Lawrence Welk Orchestra in San Francisco in 1945. He remained with the orchestra until 1970, when he left to form his own band. On television and in movies, Amodeo was the lead reed player for the Lawrence Welk Orchestra.

Amodea founded the Champagne Music Makers and spent 25 years with the band. In 1970, the same year Amodeo left the Lawrence Welk orchestra, he also became a stage technician. Although numerous attempts at success were made, the venture eventually proved to be unsuccessful. He retired from his job as a stage technician in Los Angeles in 1988.

Personal life 
He married Gloria Amodeo (née Mucci; 1924 – 1999) on November 7, 1943. Orie and Gloria had two daughters and two sons. They were married for 55 years, until his death in 1998. He died of a long illness at his home at the age of 77 years old.

References

1921 births
People from Mechanicville, New York
American saxophonists
American male saxophonists
1998 deaths
Musicians from New York (state)
20th-century American musicians
Lawrence Welk
20th-century saxophonists
20th-century American male musicians